Bruno Pabois (born 23 October 1969) is a French former professional football player and manager. As a player, he was a midfielder.

Honours 
Sedan

 Coupe de France runner-up: 1998–99

Brest

 Championnat de France Amateur: 1999–2000

France U21

 Toulon Tournament runner-up: 1991

References 

1969 births
Living people
Sportspeople from Saint-Nazaire
Footballers from Loire-Atlantique
French footballers
Association football midfielders
Stade Brestois 29 players
Nîmes Olympique players
USL Dunkerque players
CS Sedan Ardennes players
Ligue 1 players
Ligue 2 players
Championnat National players
Championnat National 2 players

France youth international footballers
French football managers
Association football coaches
Stade Brestois 29 non-playing staff